Devon Rose is a non-binary American songwriter, multi-instrumentalist, and blogger from Los Angeles, CA. Her music has been recommended by American Songwriter, Wonderland, The Line of Best Fit, Billboard, Wild Honey Pie and LADYGUNN.

Early life 
Rose was born October 21, 1995, in Los Angeles, CA. She graduated from Crossroads School for Arts and Sciences in 2014. She graduated from the University of Southern California in 2018. Rose identifies as queer. She also cites Whitney Houston, Mariah Carey and Prince as inspirations.

Career 

In 2012, Rose was picked to go to the GRAMMY Foundation's GRAMMY CAMP in New York to participate as a songwriter.

She appeared in the Samsung Level Music Lab with Halsey. She later opened for her, along with the BadSuns at the Shrine Expo Hall on a date of the Badlands Tour.
Rose has written for PopWrapped and was a Campus Editor-At-Large for the Huffington Post. In 2015, she appeared on the daytime talk show "The Doctors", after having written an open letter complaining about clothes not fitting.

In September 2021, Rose became the face of the color "GRAVEDIGGER," for Good Dye Young's latest campaign "METALHEADS."

Personal life
Devon came out as non-binary on the 12th of October 2021, their pronouns are she/they. On January 1, 2022 Devon revealed that they’d changed their name to Devon Rose.

References

1995 births
Living people
Non-binary musicians
American pop singers
American singer-songwriters
21st-century American singers